One Perfect Day (lit. Rock, Paper, Scissors of Love) is a 2013 South Korean short film directed by Kim Jee-woon, his first in the romantic comedy genre.

Upon meeting the girl of his dreams (Park Shin-hye), a loser in love (Yoon Kye-sang) asks her to play Rock-paper-scissors with him.

The 35-minute short film first premiered on April 29, 2013, at a showcase in Times Square in Seoul's Yeongdeungpo District, and was then released online on April 30 on the website of outdoor clothing brand Kolon Sport, as well as portal sites Daum and YouTube. One Perfect Day was the second short film after Park Chan-wook's Day Trip to be commissioned and funded by Kolon Sport for its "Way to Nature Film Project," which marks the company's 40th anniversary.

Plot
A man named Un-cheol (Yoon Kye-sang) is looking for a girlfriend. He goes on a series of unsuccessful dates, culminating in a disastrous blind date with Yoo-jin (Park Soo-jin), and his awkward banter, stupid jokes, and complete insensitivity to her feelings, leads Yoo-jin to ditch him while they're playing the game Rock-paper-scissors. In a flashback to Un-cheol's childhood, his father had taught him Rock-paper-scissors and given him some life lessons. As Un-cheol morosely wanders the streets that night, he finds a missing dog, which he returns to its owner, Eun-hee (Park Shin-hye). She insists on giving him a monetary reward, but instead, he asks her to play Rock-paper-scissors with him—if he wins, she goes on a date with him, but if he loses or it's a draw, he walks away and never bothers her again.

Cast
Yoon Kye-sang as Un-cheol
Park Shin-hye as Eun-hee
Park Soo-jin as Yoo-jin
Ahn Nae-sang as Un-cheol's father
Kim Beop-rae as Man in trench coat
Kim Yeo-rin as Innocent girl in the workplace
Lee Min-ah as Mrs. Kim
Lee Seon-hee as Jogging woman
Kim Yoo-joo as Drunk woman 
Baek Hyeon as Man who kisses in the workplace 
Jung Seung-ah as Octagon blind date
Park So-yeon as Restaurant blind date
Park Mi-so as Chicago blind date

References

External links 
 One Perfect Day at Kolon Sport
 
 
 

2013 films
Films directed by Kim Jee-woon
2010s Korean-language films
South Korean short films
South Korean romantic comedy films
2013 romantic comedy films
2013 short films
2010s South Korean films